Hecher is a German surname. Notable people with the surname include:

Alfons Hecher (born 1943), German sport wrestler
Lorenz Hecher (born 1946), German sport wrestler
Traudl Hecher (born 1943), Austrian alpine skier

See also
Hecker (surname)

German-language surnames